Silvia Fiorini  (born 24 December 1969) is an Italian footballer who played as a midfielder for the Italy women's national football team. She was part of the team at the inaugural 1991 FIFA Women's World Cup, UEFA Women's Euro 1997 and 1999 FIFA Women's World Cup.

References

External links
 

1969 births
Living people
Italian women's footballers
Italy women's international footballers
Place of birth missing (living people)
1991 FIFA Women's World Cup players
1999 FIFA Women's World Cup players
Women's association football midfielders
Footballers from Florence
ACF Firenze players